General elections were held in Grenada on 20 September 1954. Although independent candidates received the most votes, Eric Gairy's Grenada United Labour Party (the only political party in existence at the time) won six of the eight seats, as it had done in the 1951 elections. At this time the Legislative Council had few powers. The role of head of government remained with the Administrator.

Results

References

1954 in Grenada
Elections in Grenada
Grenada
British Windward Islands
September 1954 events in North America